The International Supply Chain Education Alliance (ISCEA) is a supply chain professionals certifying body best known for becoming the first organization validating the knowledge of supply chain managers around the world and providing them with the CSCM (Certified Supply Chain Manager) designation. Founded in 2003 and currently holding over 100,000 members, ISCEA  has its World HQ office in Beachwood, OH, USA and regional offices in LATAM, EMEA and APAC. ISCEA's mission is to provide supply chain knowledge to manufacturing and service industry professionals worldwide through Education, Certification and Recognition. ISCEA is the governing body for the Ptak Prize.

Besides Certified Supply Chain Manager (CSCM) certification, ISCEA has developed several professional certification programs that include: Certified Supply Chain Analyst (CSCA), Certified Lean Master (CLM), Certified RFID Supply Chain Manager (RFIDSCM), Certified Demand Driven Planner (CDDP), Certified HealthCare Supply Chain Analyst (CHSCA); and Certified Lean Six Sigma Yellow Belt (CLSSYB), Green Belt (CLSSGB) and Black Belt (CLSSBB).

History

First Supply Chain Management Certification

The term Supply Chain Management (SCM) was coined in the early eighties (1982) by Booz Allen Consultant, Keith Oliver, but remained only a buzzword for many years. The holistic concept of a cross-functional set of processes aimed to fulfill the customer’s needs, started to make sense to companies, consultants and academics in the early nineties. It was until the decade’s end, when technology enabled Business Process Integration throughout each company and extended to other companies, that the term SCM was widely adopted. SCM finally grew to become normal science in the first decade of the millennium.

ISCEA’s founding members identified the need of a professional SCM certification organization and developed the Certified Supply Chain Manager (CSCM) certification program. It was the first certification program developed by ISCEA and was launched simultaneously with ISCEA’s initial website in early 2003. There are other professional knowledge certifying bodies currently offering SCM certification. Some of them founded many years before ISCEA. But their SCM certification programs were released after ISCEA's CSCM:
 APICS, Founded in 1957 as American Production and Inventory Control Society and re-branded as The Association for Supply Chain Management in 2018, launched their CSCP (Certified Supply Chain Professional) programme in 2006. Three years after ISCEA's CSCM.
 Institute for Supply Management, Founded in 1915 as National Association of Purchasing Agents, launched their CPSM Certified Professional in Supply Management programme in 2008. Five years after ISCEA's CSCM.
 Council of Supply Chain Management Professionals, Founded in 1963 as Council of Logistics Management, launched their SCPro programme in 2011. Eight years after ISCEA's CSCM.

The Ptak Prize Supply Chain Awards

In 2005 ISCEA started awarding the Ptak Prize for Supply Chain Excellence, an Annual Prize aimed to recognize corporations achieving significant improvement through Vision, Business Rules, and Technology. The Ptak Prize is currently awarded in the following categories: Supply Chain Excellence, Global Case Competition, Supply Chain Professional of the Year, Best of the Best ERP Solution and 30 Under 30 Global Supply Chain Leaders.

IISB - ISCEA International Standards Board

From 2005 to 2020 Mr. Mike Sheahan, former International President of APICS, served as President of ISCEA International Standards Board (IISB). On June 30, 2020 Mr. Sheahan became “President Emeritus” and Dr. Erick C. Jones became "President-Elect", assuming the IISB leadership role. 

Dr. Jones has been in the IISB Board of Directors since 2005 and is currently Chair of the IISB Technology Committee, Engineering Research Center Program Director at the National Science Foundation,  Editor in Chief of the International Supply Chain Technology Journal (ISCTJ), the George and Elizabeth Pickett Endowed Professor in the Department of Industrial and Manufacturing Systems Engineering (IMSE) and Associate Dean for Graduate Studies in the College of Engineering at the University of Texas at Arlington.

ISCEA International Standards Board members also include Dr. Charles A. Watts, Executive Director of Education and Certification Programs at ISCEA and also Professor in the Department of Management, Marketing, and  Logistics  at  John Carroll  University; Dr. Kenneth Paetsch, former professor of Cleveland State University (CSU) and the University of Illinois Springfield (UIS); Dr. Gerald (Jerry) Ledlow, Dean of UT Health Science Center at Tyler School of Community and Rural Health; Erich Heneke, Director of Business Integrity Continuity in Mayo Clinic’s Supply Chain Management (SCM); Mike Loughrin, President of Transformance Advisors; Renata Rieder, Head of Service Management at Federal Office of Information Technology, Systems and Telecommunication for the Government of Switzerland; David Jacoby, President of Boston Strategies International; and Jorge A. Morales, former RFID technology advisor to the Mexican Government.

DDMRP - Demand Driven Planner Certification

In 2012 ISCEA partnered with the Demand Driven Institute (DDI) to offer the Certified Demand Driven Planner (CDDP) programme. The CDDP programme certifies professionals' knowledge on  Demand Driven Material Requirements Planning (DDMRP). The partnership between ISCEA and DDI ended in 2018 when DDI launched its own DDMRP certification programme. ISCEA continues to offer CDDP training and certification.

SCNext - Students and Young Supply Chain Professionals Network

In 2013 SCNext, an organization dedicated to provide opportunities to young supply chain professionals, emerged out of ISCEA. SCNext states that it is managed by Young Professionals, for Young Professionals with an international focus. SCNext provides students and young supply chain professionals with webinars, scholarships, conferences, journal articles and networking opportunities that would help them build their careers.

SCTECH - Supply Chain Technology Conference and Expo

Since 2016 ISCEA has sponsored and managed a supply chain technology conference and expo named SCTECH. Besides being a Supply Chain, Operations, Engineering and Technology professionals gathering, SCTECH provides Professional Development Units (PDUs) to ISCEA's certified professional so that they can renew their certification credentials. The event has an itinerant nature. Its first edition was held in Chicago and following editions were held in Mexico and Paris.

Supply Chain Events Accreditation

Besides SCTECH, ISCEA has provided other Supply Chain Related Events with accreditation. Therefore certified Supply Chain Professionals have been able to obtain PDUs for participating in those events and later applying for the Certificate of Participation.

First Sustainable Supply Chain Professional Certification and Global Sustainable Supply Chain Pledge Day

Following SCTECH2020, ISCEA launched the Certified Sustainable Supply Chain Professional (CSSCP) certification program. The main goal of the program is to develop and validate the knowledge of professionals capable of maximizing the success of a supply chain, while protecting the future of the planet. The program is expected to address the growing concern regarding sustainability in organizations' Digital Transformation Strategy.

To further support the development of Sustainable Supply Chains, ISCEA created the "Global Sustainable Supply Chain Pledge Day" event. An event open to all who are interested in pledging to sustainable supply chain, meeting peers with similar interests, or learning about how to further commit to sustainability by becoming an ISCEA Global Ambassador. The First Annual Global Sustainable Supply Chain Pledge Day took place in 2021 and it was a great success, with over 200 attendees and 20 speakers.

Introduction to Global Community of MOOC Partners
In September 2021 ISCEA partnered with edX, the massive open online course (MOOC) provider created by Harvard and MIT, to provide accessible supply chain knowledge to online learners around the globe.

International expansion

ISCEA Expansion into Latin America

In 2006 Seguro Popular, a governmental health-care institution created in 2002; issued an RFID technology mandate to authenticate and improve drug safety within its supply chain. ISCEA served as RFID technical advisor to the Mexican government providing guidance on best practices to implement RFID technology in Seguro Popular's Supply Chain Model, and also providing with RFID Supply Chain Manager (RFIDSCM) certification to Mexican Pharma Manufacturers and Distributors looking to comply with the mandate. Seguro Popular was later replaced by Insabi during the administration of President Andrés Manuel López Obrador, but ISCEA's presence has been expanding in Mexico and other Latin American countries ever since.

ISCEA has been active in the region through partnerships with Universities, delivering awards, participating in supply chain events and contributing with articles to supply chain media in Colombia, Costa Rica, Ecuador, Panamá, Perú and other countries.

ISCEA Expansion into Europe, the Middle East and Africa

Since 2010 ISCEA has been providing supply chain knowledge and advise in the Middle East, organizing Supply Chain Management Summits and certification workshops in UAE and Saudi Arabia.

In 2012 ISCEA partnered with GS1 Saudi Arabia and the Council of Saudi Chambers to support the human capital objectives of Saudi Arabia, providing expert supply chain advice and supply chain certification. In 2013 ISCEA awarded scholarships to 3rd- and 4th-year Saudi Arabian university students worth US$1'000,000 through The Ptak Prize.

In 2014 the French Supply Chain Management Association (FAPICS), introduced to France ISCEA's CDDP (Certified Demand Driven Planner) certification programme; and in 2016 it introduced CSCA (Certified Supply Chain Analyst). ISCEA's SCTECH 2019 was held in France in parallel to FAPICS Conference. 

ISCEA collaborated in 2019 with Africa Resource Centre (ARC) awarding future leaders of Nigeria with Certified Supply Chain Analyst (CSCA) and Certified HealthCare Supply Chain Analyst (CHSCA) scholarships worth US$550,000. ARC is an independent supply chain advisor to Ministries of Health of African Countries, aimed to improve availability of medicine and health in Africa.

In 2021 ISCEA entered into a partnership with Supply Chain Economy-Management (SCE-Management). The focus of this partnership will be strengthening supply chain systems through both capacity building and certification in Benin and French-speaking Africa. 

Other countries in EMEA in which supply chain professionals are acquiring their supply chain certification credentials from ISCEA include Iraq, Jordan, Kenya, South Africa and Spain.

ISCEA Expansion into Asia-Pacific

ISCEA has been supporting supply chain education and providing with certification in the Asia-Pacific region since 2007. Some countries in APAC in which supply chain professionals are acquiring their supply chain certification credentials from ISCEA include India, Pakistan, Bangladesh Indonesia, Singapore and Sri Lanka.

ISCEA's Certified Lean Master (CLM) programme is delivered in Hong Kong and Malaysia through SGS, the global inspection, verification, testing and certification entity.

In 2019 Tim Charlton was appointed to the position of President of ISCEA-Pacific (Australia and New Zealand) and also appointed to the ISCEA- APAC Board that included Mr. Ejazur Rahman (Bangladesh) CEO, ISCEA-Asia, Mr. Nikhil Oswal (India), CEO, ISCEA-India, Dr. Premkumar Rajagopal (Malaysia), President, MUST (Malaysia University of Science and Technology), Mr. Sandeep Chatterjee (India), Senior Manager, Deloitte India, Dr. Nyoman Pujawan, Ph.D,  (Indonesia), Professor, Institut Teknologi Sepuluh Nopember, and Dr. Harish Pant (India), Chief Business Transformation Officer, NTF (India) Pvt. Ltd.

References

External links
 
ISCEA Latin America
ISCEA EMEA
ISCEA Online
SCnext - The Youth of Supply Chain
The Ptak Prize

Professional titles and certifications 
International professional associations
Supply chain management
Business and finance professional associations
Standards